Cheng of Jin may refer to:

Marquis Cheng of Jin ( 10th century BC?)
Duke Cheng of Jin (died 600 BC)
Emperor Cheng of Jin (321–342)